The International Maritime Prize is an award granted by the International Maritime Organization to individuals or Non-governmental organizations that "have made the most significant contribution to the work and objectives of IMO." The prize is usually awarded annually by the IMO Council. Even though it is possible for the Council not to grant the award if no suitable candidate has been nominated, this has never happened since the award has been offered for the first time in 1980. Nominations for the prize can only be made either by governments of states that are members of the IMO, by  organizations, bodies and programmes that are part of the United Nations, by intergovernmental organizations which signed an agreement of co-operation with the IMO or by  non-governmental international organizations enjoying consultative
status. It is also possible that the prize be awarded posthumously.

The prize is endowed with a grant of $1,000 and a sculpture of a dolphin. In addition the awardee is invited to publish a scientific paper on a topic related to the work of the IMO which is published in the organization's quarterly magazine.

In 1998 the International Maritime Rescue Federation was the first and until now the only organization to which the prize was awarded. In 2010 Linda Johnson was the first female laureat.

Awardees 

 1980:  Modolv Hareide
 1981:  Roderick Y. Edwards
 1982:  George A. Maslov
 1983:  Hjálmar R. Bárdarson
 1984:  Shen Zhaoqi
 1985:  Per Eriksson
 1986:  Moustafa Fawzi
 1987:  James Cowley
 1988:  Emil Jansen
 1989:  Jerzy Doerffer
 1990:  Zenon Sdougos
 1991:  C.P. Srivastava
 1992:  Yoshio Sasamura
 1993:  John William Kime
 1994:  John S. Perrakis
 1995:  G. Ivanov
 1996:  T. Funder
 1997:  Gamal El-Din Ahmed Mokhtar
 1998:  International Lifeboat Federation
 1999:  Ian Mills Williams
 2000:  Heikki Juhani Valkonen
 2001:  Giuliano Pattofatto *
 2002:  Frank Wall
 2003:  William O’Neil
 2004:  Luis Martínez
 2005:  Tom Allan
 2006:  /  Igor Ponomarev * / Alfred Popp
 2007:  Jørgen Rasmussen
 2008:  Alberto Alemán Zubieta
 2009:  Johan Franson
 2010:  Linda Johnson *
 2011:  Efthimios Mitropoulos
 2012:  Dr. Thomas A. Mensah
 2013:  Dr. José Eusebio Salgado y Salgado
 2014:  Yōhei Sasakawa 
 2015:  Frank Wiswall

* The prize was awarded posthumously.

References 

International law
Legal awards